Amulet is a graphic novel series illustrated and written by Kazu Kibuishi and published by Graphix, an imprint of Scholastic. It follows the adventures of Emily, a young girl who discovers a sentient and autonomous magical circular amulet in her maternal great-grandfather's house.

Synopsis

Book 1: The Stonekeeper
After David Hayes died in a car accident, his widow, Karen, and their children, Emily and Navin, move to a house in the town of Norlen, as Karen can no longer afford to live in the house she owned with David. The house, which has been in her family for years, is large and needs care and attention. As they clean the house, Emily finds a strange amulet in the library where her great-grandfather, Silas Charnon, worked, and puts it on. That night, Karen is kidnapped by a monstrous "arachnopod". 
Emily and Navin follow in order to save their mother through the basement into another world, Aleddia. They are pursued by a mysterious elf but are rescued by a rabbit-like robot called Miskit. Miskit brings them to Silas' house, and they meet his other robots Cogsley, Morrie, Theodore, Ruby, and Bottle. Emily talks to Silas, who dies soon afterward. Emily is spoken to by the voice of the amulet, which tells her to accept the powers of the amulet in order to save their mother. Emily accepts, despite Navin's disagreement. They then hunt down the arachnopod in a plane with Navin as the pilot, and Emily uses her stone as a defense when Miskit's gun fails. They fail to rescue Karen at first, but the mysterious elf named Trellis reappears and kills the arachnopod, freeing Karen. Trellis attempts to control Emily's mind using a creature named "Sybrian" and bring her to the Elf King. However, Emily uses the stone to kill Sybrian, and scares Trellis away. Emily brings Karen back to the others, and Cogsley transforms the house into a walking mech, and sets course to find a cure for Karen.

Book 2: The Stonekeeper's Curse
The group journeys into the city of Kanalis, searching for a cure for Karen, whilst servants of the Elf King are searching for them. Coglsey informs the group that the people of Kanalis have been slowly turning into animals over the years due to a curse. They meet a foxlike man named Leon Redbeard who helps them escape from the elves, Leon claims that he has information about stonekeepers, and brings the group to a doctor. The doctor informs Emily that the only thing that can cure Karen is a fruit from the peak of Demon's Head Mountain. The elves, led by Luger and Trellis attack the city, which prompts an evacuation. Emily, Miskit, and Leon travel to Demon Head's Mountain to find the curable fruit, Navin parts ways from Emily and Leon, and he meets Balan, a blue-furred horned creature, who is from the resistance, a group fighting against the Elf King. Balan and the other rebels declare Navin as the commander of the Resistance. They help them repower the robots in the house after they were shut down to prevent the elves from gathering information, while Emily, Leon, and Miskit walk up the mountain. Along the way, Leon helps Emily use the amulet better, as well as warning her to not let the stone control her. He also teaches her the history of the Elf King. Emily, Leon, and Miskit arrive at their destination and encounter the Gadoba trees, which are future-telling trees that bear the fruit that can cure Emily's mother. Using her stone's powers, Emily finds a non-poisonous fruit, and commences her journey back to Kanalis. The elves find the Gadoba forest, and burn it down in anger. Emily finds herself at the top of the mountain, where she encounters Luger and the elves. As Luger is about to execute Emily, he is attacked by Trellis, who is unhappy with how Luger treated him. In an effort to fight back, Luger gives up control to his amulet, and he transforms into a giant. Suddenly, Navin and the others arrive at the top of the mountain, and combined with Emily's amulet, the house-mech defeats Luger. Emily falls unconscious. When she wakes up, she finds her mother back in full health.

Book 3: The Cloud Searchers
Trellis finds Luger in a cave at the foothills of Demon's Head Mountain, and finds that Luger has destroyed the amulet. Luger apologises, and he and Trellis proceed to renounce the Elf King as their commander. Leon suggests that the team should seek out the Council of Stonekeepers, who reside in Cielis, a city that is said to be gone. However, Leon believes that the city still exists, but it is hidden in the clouds. The group travels to a city with many airship docks, and they search for a pilot to escort them to Cielis. They find Enzo and Rico, who own a small ship named the Luna Moth. Before they depart, they run into Luger and Trellis, who are running away from the elf army and the Elf King's new commander, Gabilan, a mercenary who steals the memories of people. The group allows them to come along, and they escape the city. During their trip, wyverns attack the ship, damaging it and taking Cogsley and Miskit. The group stops for repairs, and after some more traveling, they find a flying temple. Trellis and Emily solve a puzzle inside of the temple, as it will unlock the path to Cielis. However, Gabilan attacks, reveals that Luger and Trellis are siblings, and battles them. Emily is able to overpower him, but she shows him mercy. After the battle, a young man named Max arrives and claims that he will be Emily's guide and escort to Cielis.

Book 4: The Last Council
Emily has a dream where she speaks with the voice of the stone. The voice says that due to magic, it will not be able to speak with Emily while she is in Cielis, and it also warns her not to pass through a certain hallway there. The party arrives at Cielis, but they are split up. Emily, Navin, and Karen are brought to an apartment, Enzo, Rico, and Leon are left on the streets of the city, and as they are suspected to be workers of the Elf King. Meanwhile, Cogsley and Miskit are saved from a Wyvern's nest by a man named Vigo, and old stonekeeper who left the Council after they forced Silas out. Emily has suspicious feelings, and Leon is surprised as how quiet the streets are. Rico, Enzo, and Leon learn that many of the people in Cielis are "ghosts". Leon breaks Luger and Trellis out of prison, and defeats guards, who turn to stone upon death. The next day, Emily is woken up and taken to a Garden, where she meets other young stonekeepers. Emily discovers that she is competing for a place on the council, and she protests to Max, saying that she only wanted to speak with them. The council arrives, and tells the stonekeepers that they will enter the void and face challenges. The stonekeepers are transported to caves and she runs away from monsters called grouls. After escaping, Only Emily, Max, Pierce, and Ronan remain. They find a room with a children's playground game. The 4 beat the challenge, and they walk through a hallway, the same one that the voice warned her not to go through. Max enters the room and finds the mother stone, the material that amulets are made from. Max reveals that they were in the catacombs of Cielis, and that he had set up Emily to help him acquire the mother stone. Vigo, Cogsley, and Miskit arrive at Cielis and try to stop Max, but he escapes with the elves.

Book 5: Prince of the Elves
A flashback shows Max as a promising advocate for the Guardian Council along with a young Vigo, but his father refuses to allow Max to continue learning as he wants Max to follow in his footsteps, not his grandfather's. Max's friend, Layra comes to him when her parents are imprisoned for suspicions that they are on the side of the elf king, despite their contributions. When Max's father expresses disinterest in helping them because of his distrust for elves, Max breaks into Yarboro Prison and breaks them out. He shows them to an airship that will take them to safety. Shortly after taking off, they are shot down and killed by an armed airship. In anger, Max uses his stone to destroy the attacking airship. He is then sentenced to 50 years in the Ice Prison of Korthan, which he escapes from. The environment bests him, but before he perishes, The Voice approaches him, and offers to keep him alive in exchange for his services. In the present, Max and the Elf King visit the Ice Prison. Max frees a giant named Chronos, and empowers him with the remaining piece of the mother stone. Meanwhile, after Emily, Trellis and Vigo assemble as the remaining members of the  Council of Stonekeepers, while Navin prepares the resistance for war, as they have found out that the elves were planning an attack on Frontera. Navin and a young woman named Alyson assemble an air fleet, complete with jets and mechs. Max and the Elves attack, destroying many ships. Unbeknownst to everyone except a worried Luger, Trellis is secretly attempting to travel to the past through the void to stop the terrible things that the elves did, which were influenced by the elf king, when he was actually just going into his memories. Emily joins him, telling him they're all in danger. Trellis wakes up to find the airship destroyed and all of them falling, but manages to land everyone safely. He reenters the void to wake up a still-sleeping Emily, and finds they're in the moment Max succumbed to the Voice. They wake up, and so does Max a few miles away. The Voice approaches Max, heals him, and claims that there is work to be done.

Book 6: Escape from Lucien
Max promises the Elf King that he will kill the other stone keepers once and for all, even though he actually wants to assemble them to kill The Voice inside the void. The elves launch another attack on the resistance fleet, prompting Navin, Alyson, and other young fighters to escape to the ruined city of Lucien. While in Lucien, they are pursued by shadows, which are the same species as Sybrian from the first novel. The shadows claim one of the group as victims, but the others are saved by an elf named Riva, who shows them that the inhabitants of Lucien have moved underground. Navin also finds that other members of the resistance, such as Balan are residing in the underground portion of Lucien.. When shadows attack, Riva attempts to evacuate everyone via the underground trains. Navin, Alyson, and Riva's advisor, the robot General Pil, orders them to kill  as many shadows as they can, but this is unsuccessful. They're forced to escape to a portal where they borrow mech suits from Pil's parents. They travel to Frontera, the Resistance's base, to attempt to launch an attack on the Elf King's kingdom, Valcor. Meanwhile, the four stone keepers arrive at a memory of Valcor, where the Voice lives. During the confrontation, Chronos is killed, and Max decides he cannot continue on his current path any longer, after being reminded about everything he has done and seeing he was simply a corpse being kept alive by the Voice. The Voice accepts this and takes Max's life away. Before dying, he tells them to visit Algos Island for Trellis. The remaining three stonekeepers arrive in the real world, on an elven ship that is crashing. Trellis proves himself to the elves by using his amulet to create a large bubble shield. Emily, Vigo, Trellis and the others begin a search for Algos Island.

Book 7: Firelight
Emily has a dream where she is younger, and is on a camping trip with her father. Vigo, Trellis, and Emily take the Luna Moth to search for Algos Island. They encounter a supplies station, and decided to stop. After exploring around, they find projections of memories from former people from the station. Emily finds out that the reason Algos Island was not on a map was because the supply station was called Algos Island. Meanwhile, Alyson, Navin, and General Pil arrive at their destination. They sell their mechs for a bad price, so they ask if they can work at a restaurant on air that making a destination at Frontera. Before the restaurant reaches frontera, 2 Elf pilots find them and bring them to Frontera. When Vigo, Trellis, and Emily return to the Luna Moth, they find out that Gabilan was hiding on board, but only because he wanted to help them. He takes Trellis and Emily with him in his submarine. Emily decides to rest, and she has the same dream about the camping trip. She converses with her father, and they discuss how they never were able to go on that trip due to his death. Gabilan, Trellis, and Emily arrive at their destination, and Gabilan shows that he has been storing all the memories he stole in an underwater citadel. Trellis finds the memory he wants to view, and he and Emily enter it. They see memories of Trellis's childhood, and of his father, the Elf King. Trellis tells Emily about when he saw his father remove his mask, revealing that he was just a corpse being used a puppet. As they are about to exit the memory through a portal, Emily sees her father in another one, and decides to follow him. Trellis reluctantly follows Emily. They find themselves following along a suicidal man, who stops his car in the middle of the road. Emily then notices that they are in her hometown, and that the approaching car is her family's. The car crashes, and Emily rushes over to save her father from dying again. Trellis tries to stop her from interfering, so Emily sends a burst of fire from the Amulet to stop Trellis. Emily notices that she is losing control of the stone, and Emily's father reveals himself to be The Voice, who disguised itself to trick Emily. Emily asks Trellis to find her family, before she becomes a firebird. In the real world, Strikerfish possessed by shadows flood Gabilan's citadel. Trellis escapes the citadel with a bubble shield, while Gabilan parts ways with Trellis. Navin, Alyson, and General Pil arrive at Frontera and reunite with Karen, Leon, and the others. The resistance prepare to board a spaceship to a resistance base on another planet, while Emily is revealed to be fully under the control of The Voice.

Book 8: Supernova
Emily is commanded by the voice to wreak havoc on a city. Vigo and Trellis witness Emily struggling to destroy some things, which gives them hope that Emily is still there. Meanwhile, in the void, Emily is seen trying to escape The Voice's control. She meets an older version of herself, and learns that the Voice's name is Ikol, and that Ikol wants to rid Alledia of all other species so more of Ikol's kind can make Alledia their new home. Navin and Alyson run missions on a new planet, and learn more about the resistance's reach across planets, and prepares to battle an army of shadows. Emily breaks free of Ikol completely, takes full control of the stone, and unlocks powers that she had not learned before. She uses the stone's magic to fly to Valcor, and she unmasks the Elf King, revealing that the Elf King is a mere vessel for Ikol to control, unlike Max who was only working for Ikol. Emily vows that she will defeat Ikol.

Main characters

Emily Hayes
Emily Hayes is a 10 - 12 year old stonekeeper and the successor of the late infamous Silas Charnon, her late maternal great-grandfather; she is a leading member of the remaining Guardian Council. She is the only daughter of Karen and David, and older sister to  Navin Hayes. She has short bright red hair, and later uses a long walking stick to channel the amulet's immense magical strength and abilities via Leon's advice.

Described as a "natural born leader", she has demonstrated herself to be a very skilled and adept fighter and stonekeeper, even if she has much to learn about the true nature of her stone. Her goal upon entering Alledia was to find a cure for Karen when she was poisoned after she was stung by an arachnopod, but she remained in Alledia after her mother was cured in order to lend support in the fight against the Elf King and later the Voice of the amulet itself.

After saving her mother, and curing her from the arachnopod's poison as well in the second book, she became more comfortable with being a 'hero', and claims even if she did intend to go back to Earth, the amulet would stop her, but in the third book this is revealed to be false. In the same book, she recruits Trellis and becomes one of his only initial friends. In the sixth book, when Max Griffin accepts his fate of dying, she tries to prevent that, which shows another decision affected from her compassionate side. Emily is usually very resistant to the Voice's attempts to control her, except in the seventh book; when the Voice finds out about her longing for her dead father, he causes her to give in to her desire for revenge against the man that accidentally caused the death of David Hayes, and she turns into a firebird (that is, an enormous phoenix) and becomes an unwilling servant of the Voice. Then she is turned back by a trip to the Void and meets her elderly future self.

Navin Hayes
Navin is Emily Hayes' younger brother. Navin is initially childish and a little immature, but matures over the series. Navin seems to be naturally talented at controlling robots and automatons, stemming from his love for video games as a child. This talent has helped him perform feats that help the group. In the first book, Navin flies a plane with other members of the group. Navin learns how to control the Charnon House, and in the second book, he defeats Luger and saves Emily with his control of the house-robot. In the third, when Enzo's robot loses control of the Luna Moth ship, Navin quickly takes control and prevents them from falling. In the fifth book, Navin attempts to defeat Max in one of the ships, but ultimately fails. In the sixth book, Navin helps defeat the shadows in the cleaning mech suits.

The robots made by Silas consider Navin as their chief. Navin is also the commander of the Resistance. He is shown to have brown hair, resembling his deceased father.

Trellis
Trellis is the son of the Elf King and younger brother of Luger, as well as a stonekeeper and intended successor to the throne of Gulfen. After failing to capture Emily and having his act of interception at Gondoa Mountain seen as treason, Trellis and his brother Luger abandon the Elf King, eventually joining Emily and the Resistance after Emily defends them from the Elf King's soldiers.

Originally, Trellis played the antagonist in the first two books, but in the third his purposes were revealed. In the first book, he had attempted to force Emily into defeating his father, the Elf King, through the kidnapping of her mom. In the third book, Emily saves him from the Elf King's guards when they attempted to arrest him, using a stunning staff to electrocute him. He tells Emily that his father is being possessed by something, and that he wanted to destroy whatever was controlling his dead body by destroying the amulet of the king. In the fifth book, they find out it was the Voice. In the sixth book, Trellis becomes warmer to the crew of the Luna Moth, especially Luger, playing a game of Othello together and exchanging witty banter. Both did not know they were brothers until book three, since Gabilan stole their memories. Trellis starts trusting Emily after her step to save him in book 5, eventually developing a strong bond of trust with her and becoming close.

Like most elves, Trellis has grey skin, but with a lighter tone. He is shown to have long white hair, and in the beginning of the series had sharp teeth, but that was removed after the fifth book. He has a long stitched up scar on his left eye. When he and Emily enter his stolen memories in the seventh book, he finds out that he got his scar when the king, who had abnormally sharp and long fingernails, scratched his eye with it. Trellis is especially talented in defending with the amulet.

Trellis believes his father has long been dead and is under the possession of his stone. His goal is to destroy the stone, and prevent any further harm to his nation, Gulfen, and the rest of Alledia. Trellis has very few memories from his childhood. Many significant events from his past are revealed to him when Trellis tries to enter the Void in book 5, as he finds out he was primarily raised by his mild historian uncle and when he entered his memories in book 7, learning about how he received his scar and the fate of his late uncle, and in book 8, he is in a memory of where a woman which he does not know who turns out to be Emily Hayes, and goes into a small shack, and sees his mother, frozen and passed away as only he survived.

Vigo Light
Vigo first appears in the fourth book, when Cogsley and Miskit fall off the Luna Moth and he rescues them and brings them to his house. As a child, he befriended Max Griffin, who often had no friends due to his respect to elves, even though the specific elves he respected did a lot to help the city of Cielis. Soon after he joined the guardian council (the protectors of Cielis) he left because the council only made its decisions based on its fears. When he grew up, Vigo married someone, but after his wife died, his son made an attempt to travel into the past to revive her, a technique of using the power stonekeepers possessed that Silas had made a theory of, when really he was just entering his memories. He stayed in his memories for months, never waking up, then died, causing much grief to Vigo. In the other books, he tries his best to help the crew of the Luna Moth. He originally disliked Trellis, but became neutral to him in the sixth book. In the seventh book, he mentioned that he didn't like leaving Emily with Gabilan as, by his once being a father, he had a father's instinct. He has a grey beard, and wears a blue overcoat. Interestingly, his stone is green and does not have the Voice's symbol on it, like all the other stones do.

Leon Redbeard
Leon Redbeard, like many other citizens of Kanalis, came under the effects of a curse during his human childhood, causing him to become a humanoid fox (with others in the city becoming different animals). Leon's father was a guard of the jail where the Elf King was kept imprisoned, and was later killed when the King escaped. After this event Leon decided to avenge his father and worked for the Guardian Council to defeat the Elf King, and so looked for Emily per their request. In the second and third books, Leon is able to teach Emily basic lessons on how to wield the amulet's power, teaching her to channel her energy through a staff and how to protect items and beings using her stone. In the fourth book, Leon helps Enzo and Alyson Hunter free Trellis and 
Luger from Cielis jail. He makes short cameo appearances in the fifth, sixth and seventh book.

Max Griffin
Max Griffin makes his debut in the third book to take Emily to Cielis after she activates a beacon. In the fourth book, he, Emily and two other young Stonekeepers were transported to the caverns of Cielis instead of the void. The four complete multiple tasks, and found themselves the main chamber containing the mother stone. He steals it, revealing his true loyalty to the nation of the Elves. The fifth book shows his tense relationship with his father, and friendship with a young elf called Layra, whose family was persecuted against because they were elves, despite their help in building Cielis. When he destroys a city airship in anger for shooting down Layra's family, he's sentenced to fifty years in prison. His partially successful escape and subsequent death results in the stone taking over. His last appearance was in the sixth book, when he spies on the resistance by hiding in an illusion of clouds while Navin is learning in the colossus program. He sends a servant to request the Guardian Council's help, when he talks to them asking them to help him fight off the voice. Then they all enter the void and talk to the voice where it promptly undoes all that it has done, killing him. His final words were to Trellis that were important: "Forgive your people. They did not know... That you are the king." This meant that Max had been a false prince of the elves for his life and Trellis is the true king.

The Elf King
The Elf King is mentioned in the first book and makes his debut in the second book. He was the evil ruler of Alledia and was originally an elf child until he lost control of his powers and became a monster. He was reverted to normal by a group of stonekeepers including Silas Charnon, and was locked up. His stone returned to him as he died and reanimated him, allowing him to escape. He took over the Elf nation of Gulfen and led an army to attack the city of Cielis. At some point, his wife (who apparently died) gave birth to Trellis and Luger. He was annoyed by Trellis' rebellious streak and he eventually allowed a shadow to possess his son. When Emily came to Alledia, he first attempted to recruit her, then tried to kill her when she refused to join him. In the fifth book, the thing controlling him was revealed to be the Voice. In the eighth book, Emily ripped off his mask, revealing the Voice's symbol branded on his face. The removal of his mask killed the King.

Supporting characters

Karen Hayes
The wife of the late David Hayes and mother to Emily and Navin. She happens to be the granddaughter of the deceased Silas Charnon, and grandmother of Moze.The amulet's previous host and Stonekeeper. She has light blue eyes, blonde hair and is tall and slim.

Alyson Hunter
Alyson, or simply called Aly, is Navin's friend. Her parents own a restaurant in Cielis, but later, her father is shown to help the Resistance by flying massive and sophisticated robots to defeat the Elf King. Aly and Navin also take part in this.

Riva Ash
Riva Ash is the mayor of Lucien who cared for the resistance and became good friends with Navin and Aly when she saved them from a creature which takes over others. She had a relationship with a Gadoba tree, Father Charles. She was chosen to be mayor since her father helped Lucien survive.She is about Trellis's age and tries to support him during these hard times.

Enzo and Rico
Enzo and Rico are two brothers who were first shown relaxing in a bar. Enzo is more bossy and rude than Rico, but is kind-hearted. They also own an airship called Luna Moth.

Cogsley, Miskit, Morrie, Theodore, Ruby, and Bottle
Cogsley, Miskit, Morrie, Theodore, Ruby, and Bottle are the robots created by Silas that help Emily in her voyage and journey.

Dagno
Dagno is a baby wyvern who was adopted by Cogsley and Miskit. Cogsley decided to add the wyvern with the team after multiple unsuccessful attempts of getting rid of Dagno. Dagno is very loyal to his friends, as it is shown in one of the books when Gabilan tries to harm Rico. Dagno hits Gabilan with his head, that makes Gabilan leave Rico, but Dagno gets hurt. Cogsley also says that Dagno has a "Goofy Grin".

Moze
Moze is a boy of Emily's age whom she first and last meets in book 8. Moze is also a stonekeeper. At last, when an old lady is seen fighting Ikol and Moze urges Emily to go in a safe portal, Emily is shocked as she realizes that the old lady was herself and no one else. She asks Moze that will they meet in the future, to which Moze replies as yes. But after Emily is gone, Ikol throws the old Emily to a pile of rocks, and then it is revealed that Moze is Emily's future son.

Volumes

On October 3, 2014, Kibuishi confirmed on Twitter that the series will have nine volumes. He estimated that the final volume would come out in 2021. However, the release date was pushed back to November 8, 2022.  According to a tweet from April 2022, the book will "take about another year to publish", thus it is likely Amulet 9 will be released in Spring of 2023.

Film adaptation
In 2016, 20th Century Fox and Temple Hill Entertainment announced production of an adaptation of the graphic novel miniseries. The project had been previously set up at Warner Bros with Will Smith and James Lassiter's Overbrook Entertainment and Akiva Goldsman's Weed Road shingle, with Smith's kids, Willow and Jaden, being previously attached to star. Aron Eli Coleite was selected to write the script.

References

External links
 

Science fiction graphic novels
American comics adapted into films
2008 comics debuts